Pociūnai may refer to one of the following locations in Lithuania:

 Pociūnai, in the Radviliškis district municipality, Šiauliai County
 Pociūnai (Ignalina), in the Ignalina district municipality, Utena County
 Pociūnai (Joniškis), in the Joniškis district municipality, Šiauliai County
 Pociūnai (Kaunas), in the Kaunas district municipality, Kaunas County
 Pociūnai (Pakruojis), in the Pakruojis district municipality, Šiauliai County
 Pociūnai (Prienai), in the Prienai district municipality, Kaunas County
 Pociūnai (Raseiniai), in the Raseiniai district municipality, Kaunas County
 Pociūnai (Širvintos), in the Širvintos district municipality, Vilnius County
 Pociūnai (Vilnius), in the Vilnius district municipality, Vilnius County